The 1838 Druze attack on Safed began on July 5, 1838, during the Druze revolt against the rule of Ibrahim Pasha of Egypt. Tensions had mounted as the Druze captured an Egyptian garrison outside of Safed. The local Safed militia of several hundred was heavily outnumbered by the Druze, and the city was gripped in despair as the militia eventually abandoned the city and the Druze rebels entered the city on July 5. The Druze rebels  and a Muslim mob descended on the Jewish quarter of Safed and, in scenes reminiscent of the Safed plunder four years earlier, spent three days attacking Jews, plundering their homes and desecrating their synagogues. Some Jews ended up leaving the town, moving south to Jerusalem and Acre. Among them was Israel Beck, whose printing press had been destroyed a second time.

Prelude

By the 19th-century, the Galilean city of Safed comprised a major Jewish center. It had become a kabbalistic centre during the 16th-century, reaching a size of about 15,000 at its peak. Despite the decline through the 17th and 18th centuries, by the 1830s there were still around 3,500-4,000 Jews living there, comprising at least half the population. The Jews of Safed had been subjected to a prolonged attack in 1834 during the Peasants' Revolt: Over 5,000 Arab peasant rebels had launched a revolt protesting against legislation imposed by the new Egyptian ruler Muhammad Ali and some had used the uprising as an opportunity to attack the Jews. After several months, the Egyptians managed to crush the rebellion and regain control of the county and the Jews of Safed began to rehabilitate themselves. Not long after, Safed was again the scene of devastation when in 1837 a strong earthquake resulted in thousands of deaths and the destruction of many buildings. The northern, Jewish section of the town was almost entirely destroyed. By 1838, the tense relationship between the fellahin and the Egyptian overlords was again mounting and a full-scale Druze revolt erupted in January. In summer of 1838, the Druze captured a heavily outnumbered Egyptian garrison outside Safed.

The attack
The Jewish population relied on the protection of an Arab governor against the Druze. Dr. Elizer Loewe wrote in his diary:
We huddled together in Rebbe Avraham Dov's house... The women were hysterical and the children crying. The Rebbe asked me to write a note in Arabic to the mayor, pleading with him not to forsake us in this desperate time. I did so, but his answer was mere lip service.

According to Loewe, the mayor and his militia fled the city, and the Jews became Open prey for the ravenous rebels. The Druze rebels were joined by Muslim mob and they looted the Jewish quarters, as the Druze rebels thought the Jews possessed hidden treasures and local Muslims encouraged them to attack. The plunder lasted for 3 days.

During the course of the attack, some Jews were assisted by friendly Arabs. One Arab by the name of Muhammed Mustafa, had helped protect them, lending them money and providing them with food and clothing. This time, Ibrahim Pasha's response was more swift, and after a few days things returned to normal.

See also
 1660 destruction of Safed
 1929 Safed riots

References

History of Safed
1838 Druze attack 
Jews and Judaism in Safed
Antisemitism in the Ottoman Empire
1838 riots
Druze attack on Safed
1838 in Judaism
History of the Druze